Lynch is a masculine given name which may refer to:

 Lynch Cooper (c. 1905–1971), Aboriginal Australian sprinter
 Sir Lynch Cotton, 4th Baronet (c. 1705–1775), Member of Parliament
 Lynch Davidson (1873–1952), American politician, Lieutenant Governor of Texas from 1921 to 1923
 Lynch Ipera (born 1976), Papua New Guinean boxer

Masculine given names